The Hiwassee River has its headwaters on the north slope of Rocky Mountain in Towns County in the northern area of the State of Georgia. It flows northward into North Carolina before turning westward into Tennessee, flowing into the Tennessee River a few miles west of what is now State Route 58 in Meigs County, Tennessee.

Hydrography 
The river is dammed by the Tennessee Valley Authority (TVA) in four locations, all in Western North Carolina: Chatuge Dam, Mission Dam (not owned by TVA), Hiwassee Dam, and Apalachia Dam.  Water is diverted from the stream bed at Apalachia Dam and sent through a pipeline, which is tunneled through the mountains for eight miles (13 km); then it flows through the Apalachia Powerhouse to generate electricity. The stretch of the river that flows between Apalachia Dam and Apalachia Powerhouse features reduced flow. The John Muir Trail in Tennessee's Cherokee National Forest goes along this part of the river.

The  stretch of river that flows from the North Carolina/Tennessee state line to U.S. Highway 411 near Delano is designated as a Tennessee State Scenic River (Class III Partially Developed River). For recreational purposes, it is managed by the Tennessee Resource Management Division, in cooperation with TVA. The river features Class I through Class III rapids, depending on water levels.

After exiting the mountains through a gorge, the Hiwassee broadens, meandering through rural Polk and Bradley counties in Tennessee. It is crossed by a bridge carrying US-411 soon after it exits the mountains. U.S. Route 11 passes over the river at Calhoun and Charleston, Tennessee, where local industries such as Bowater Newsprint Mill and Arch/Olin Chemical use river water in their operations.  

At this point the river interfaces with the impoundment of Chickamauga Dam (located in Chattanooga, Tennessee). Many marshes and wetlands surround the main channel, providing rich habitats for wildlife and areas for hunting and fishing. 

Interstate 75 passes over the river on the border of McMinn and Bradley counties. The Hiwassee continues westward; it is crossed by SR 58's bridge (this bridge replaced an old historic and narrow bridge) on its way to its confluence with the Tennessee River. This area of the river is enjoyed by boaters, fishermen, and water skiers.

Major tributaries include Valley River, Nottely River, Coker Creek, Big Lost Creek, Spring Creek, Conasauga Creek, and Toccoa/Ocoee River.

Etymology
The Hiwassee River has been known by many variant spellings. The best-known of these is Hiawassee, which is also the name of the Georgia town through which the river flows. Other alternate spellings include Heia Wassea and Highwassee. Some less obvious but related names include Eufasee, Eufassee, Euphasee and Quannessee. Some Cherokee say the name came from the Cherokee word Ayuhwasi, which means a meadow or savanna. The Muskogee (Creek) say the river's name is Koasati or Hitchiti, Muskogee language words for the copperhead snake. The river is known for its many copperheads, even today.

History 
Various Muskogean-speaking ethnic groups occupied the region of this river for many centuries before the arrival of the Cherokee. Tribes related to the Muscogee/ Creek, who also speak Muskogee languages, include the Choctaw, and Chickasaw. (The Seminole arose as a Muskogee-speaking people in Florida in the 19th century, made up of refugees from warfare in other regions.) 

The Cherokee are an Iroquoian-speaking people, believed to have migrated to the Southeast from northern areas near the Great Lakes. That is where most Iroquoian-speaking peoples arose and had their territories, including the Five Nations of the Haudenosaunee (Iroquois Confederacy). (Later there were Six Nations, when the Tuscarora migrated from the South to New York in the early 18th century.)

Some historians originally thought that because the Europeans had encountered the Cherokee in the Hiwassee Valley in the 18th century, the latter people had occupied the territory for a longer period, but their dates in this region are unclear.

Early Spanish contact
Spanish explorers visited the region in the 16th century.  Hernando de Soto probably crossed the Hiwassee River near its confluence with the Tennessee River at Hiwassee Island, in the spring of 1541 AD. Juan Pardo probably followed a trail that paralleled the river in 1567 AD. The town names and indigenous words that were recorded by de Soto's chroniclers in present-day Georgia, North Carolina and Tennessee, can be translated by using contemporary Muskogean dictionaries. Most of the names and words are from the Koasati and Hitchiti languages, but a few are Muskogean and Alabama words. None is Cherokee. 

The earliest European maps from the 17th century vaguely show the Hiwassee River Basin occupied by mountain branches of the Apalachee and the Kusa. The Kusa (or Coosa in English) were a chiefdom of the South Appalachian Mississippian culture. They are considered to be ancestral to the Muscogee Creek people. The Tama-tli of the Altamaha River Basin in southeastern Georgia are known to have had a colony in the Hiwassee valley between what is now Andrews, North Carolina and the Hiwassee River at Murphy, North Carolina.

British colonial era
English explorers and traders in the 1690s found most of the river valley occupied by Muskogean and Yuchi towns.  At this time Cherokee villages were generally located east and north of the river.  In 1714, two South Carolinan traders supplied the Cherokee with firearms and directed them to attack the Yuchi villages on the Hiwassee River. Most of the men in one Yuchi town were gone when the Cherokee attacked. They killed the remaining Yuchi, who had no firearms. 

In 1715, the Cherokee invited the leaders of many Muskogean provinces, which eventually comprised the Creek Confederacy, to a diplomatic conference at Tugaloo at the headwaters of the Savannah River, in what became the state of South Carolina. They murdered the Muskogean leaders as they slept. This precipitated a 40-year-long war between the Muscogee Creek and the Cherokee. Due to disunity among the Creek, a loose confederacy, the Cherokee took over the northeastern tip of what is now Georgia, but then was part of South Carolina.  They drove the Muskogee and Yuchi from most of western North Carolina to west and south of the Hiwassee. Most of the branches of the Creek lost interest in this war after a few years.

18th-century Cherokee homeland
The Hiwassee River and its tributaries were part of Cherokee territory in the early 18th century. A town known as "Hiwassee" (Ayuhwasi) was located near the mouth of Peachtree Creek. Murphy, North Carolina later developed here.  The area of the Valley River, a tributary to the Hiwassee, contained many Cherokee towns. Towns along these two rivers, plus those along the Nantahala, were collectively called the "Valley Towns", a geographical grouping devised by English traders and colonists. The Cherokee town known as Great Hiwassee (Ayuhwasi Egwahi) was located in today's Polk County, Tennessee, where the Hiwassee River emerges from the mountains. The settlements on the western side of the mountains were known as the Overhill Towns.

The Indians had several "highways" which passed through the area. The Great Trading Path, the Overhill Trading Path, and the Unicoi Turnpike ran along much of the Hiwassee River. Another old path, known as the Warrior Path, ran from southern lands to Great Hiwassee, and then up the Conasauga Creek to the Cherokee town known as Great Tellico on the Tellico River.

The Kowita Creek (Muscogee), whose homeland was in the North Carolina mountains (east of present-day Franklin and south of Asheville), continued to fight the Cherokee. By the 1750s, the Kowita had developed such a powerful military machine that they could consistently defeat any band of the Cherokee that they encountered. By 1755, they had destroyed all of the Cherokee towns in Georgia and in the Hiwassee Valley. 

The Kowita Taskimikko, or general, bragged to some English traders that he sent women and children in the front line against the Cherokee town of Quanesee, and that its people ran from the village without fighting.  The archives of colonial Georgia, where this boast is recorded, hold a 1755 map created by John Mitchell and commissioned by the Colony of North Carolina. Over the entire southern half of western North Carolina and all of northeastern Georgia are the words, "Deserted Cherokee Towns."

In 1763, the Cherokee were forced to cede all of their lands in present-day North Carolina east of the 80th longitude line, which runs through Murphy and crosses the Hiwassee River there. The British were punishing them for their support of the French during the French and Indian War (known worldwide as the Seven Years' War between Britain and France). The line runs roughly 45 miles west of present-day Cherokee, North Carolina.

The Creek agreed to give up their recently reconquered lands in North Carolina and Georgia in return for most of Alabama. The French ceded their claimed lands east of the Mississippi River to Great Britain after the war.

American Revolutionary War effects
Some Cherokee families continued to live east of the Appalachians after 1763. But, at any time an Anglo-European settler could arrive on a Cherokee farmstead, and evict the Cherokee. In 1776 during the American Revolution, the Cherokee became allies of the British, hoping to expel the European-American settlers from their lands. They raided and killed residents of frontier farmsteads across a broad swath of the Carolinas.

The counterattack by the Euro-American patriot militia of 5,000 men left most of the remaining Cherokee towns in North Carolina, South Carolina and Georgia in ruins. The survivors initially fled into the Tennessee River valley in the vicinity of Chickamauga Creek in southeast Tennessee (present-day Chattanooga), and settled upriver of an old Muskogee/Kusa town, Citico on Chickamauga Creek. Within a decade many had migrated southwest, settling in northwestern Georgia and northeastern Alabama. Some Chickamauga Cherokee returned to the Hiwassee Valley after the Revolution, but the center of the Cherokee culture by then had moved further south and west.

Passage of the Indian Removal Act of 1830 preceded removal of almost all members of the Five Civilized Tribes in the Southeast.  The Cherokee were divided over the government's proposal for removal to Indian Territory, with most opposing it. One group of leaders signed the New Echota Treaty to cede communal lands, hoping to reach a favorable deal with the US government, as they believed relocation was inevitable. Others opposed it but, finally in 1838-1839, US soldiers forced the Cherokee west on the Trail of Tears.  They built internment camps in northern Alabama and in Tennessee along the Hiwassee River as government forces rounded up the people. One of the largest such camps was Fort Cass near present-day Charleston, Tennessee, on the south bank of the Hiwassee River.

Notability
The Hiwassee River passes through downtown Murphy, North Carolina, where it flows past a site famous in Cherokee Indian mythology. The legend tells of a house-sized leech that could command the waters and use them to sweep hapless people to the bottom of the river and consume them. It was known as Tlanusi-yi, "The Leech Place."

The river flows west from North Carolina into Tennessee. This area is popular for whitewater rafting, whitewater canoeing, and whitewater kayaking. Recreational fishing is popular with several outfitters located near the river, and there is also industrial activity along the river, such as paper mills.

The Interstate 75 bridge crossed the Hiwassee between McMinn and Bradley counties in Tennessee. This was the site of a fatal 99-vehicle accident in December 1990, during extremely foggy weather in the area of a paper mill in the valley. During the years since then, a huge system of warning signs and lights has been built on that stretch of Interstate 75 to warn automobiles and trucks against incidents of foul weather, characterized by heavy rains and clouds. Many serious collisions had occurred in this area.

See also
 List of rivers of Tennessee

Notes 
 Mooney, James. Myths of the Cherokee (1900, repr. 1995)
 Duncan, Barbara R. and Riggs, Brett H. Cherokee Heritage Trails Guidebook. University of North Carolina Press: Chapel Hill (2003).

References

External links

 Hiwassee River Basin Web Site
 
 Tennessee Scenic Rivers Association (TSRA)
 TVA Apalachia Release Schedule

 
Rivers of Georgia (U.S. state)
Rivers of North Carolina
Rivers of Tennessee
Cherokee Nation (1794–1907)